François Tusques (born January 27, 1938 in Paris, France) is a French jazz pianist. Tusques played a significant role in the emergence of a community of free jazz musicians in France.

Discography 
 Free Jazz, with Bernard Vitet, Beb Guérin, Michel Portal, François Jeanneau, 1965.
 La Maison Fille du Soleil,with Don Cherry, Beb Guérin, Jean-François Jenny-Clark, 1965.
 Le Nouveau Jazz, with Barney Wilen, Jean-François Jenny-Clark, Aldo Romano, 1967.
François Tusques – La Reine des Vampires - Eddy Gaumont plays violin, 1967
 Sunny Murray, concert live with l'Acoustical Swing Unit, 1968.
 Big Chief, Acoustical Swing Unit, 1969.
 Piano Dazibao, 1970 - Futura Ger 14 
 The Panther and the Lash, with Clifford Thornton, Beb Guérin, Noel McGhee, 1970.
 Dazibao n°2, 1971 - Futura Ger32 
 Intercommunal Music with Sunny Murray, Alan Silva, Beb Guérin, Steve Potts, Alan Shorter, Bob Reid, Louis Armfield, 1971.
 Répression, with Colette Magny, 1972.
 Dansons Avec Les Travailleurs Immigrés, with Michel Marre, Claude Marre, Carlos Andreu, Denis Levaillant, 1974.
 Ça Branle Dans la Manche, with Serge Utgé-Royo, 1975. 
 Le piano préparé, 1977.
 Après la marée noire - Vers une Musique Bretonne Nouvelle with Jean-Louis Le Vallégant, Gaby Kerdoncuff, Philippe Le Strat, Tanguy Ledore, Ramadolf, Michel Marre, Samuel Ateba, Carlos Andreu, Jo Maka, Kilikus, 1979.
 Poemas de Federico Garcia Lorca with Violeta Ferrer, 1980.
 Le Musichien, with Carlos Andreu, Ramadolf, Kilikus, Sylvain Kassap, Jean-Jacques Avenel, Yegba Likoba, Bernard Vitet, Danièle Dumas, Sam Ateba, Tanguy Le Doré, Jean-Louis Le Vallégant, Philippe Le Strat, 1983.
 Génération, music for the documentary by Daniel Edinger, 1988. 
 Le Jardin des Délices, 1992.
 Blue Phédre, 1996.
 Blues Suite with Noel McGhie et Denis Colin, 1998.
 Arc Voltaic, with Carlos Andreu, Didier Petit, Denis Colin, Danièle Dumas, 2003.
 Topolitologie, with Noel McGhie, 2010.
 Near the Oasis, with Sonny Simmons, 2011.
 L'étang Change (Mais Les Poissons Sont Toujours Là), 2012
 La Jungle Du Douanier Rousseau, with Alexandra Grimal, Sylvain Guérineau, 2014.
 Le Fond De L'Air, with Pablo Cueco, Myrtha Pozzi, 2014.
 Le Chant Du Jubjub, with Isabel Juanpera, Itaru Oki, Claude Parle, 2015.

Further reading
 
 

French jazz pianists
French male pianists
Musicians from Paris
French male jazz musicians